List of motorcycles by type of engine is a list of motorcycles by the type of motorcycle engine used by the vehicle, such as by the number of cylinders or configuration.

A transverse engine is an engine mounted in a vehicle so that the engine's crankshaft axis is perpendicular to the direction of travel. In a longitudinal engine configuration, the engine's crankshaft axis is parallel with the direction of travel. However, the description of the orientation of "V" and "flat" motorcycle engines differs from this convention. Motorcycles with a V-twin engine mounted with its crankshaft mounted in line with the frame, e.g. the Honda CX series, are said to have "transverse" engines, while motorcycles with a V-twin mounted with its crankshaft mounted perpendicular to the frame, e.g. most Harley-Davidsons, are said to have "longitudinal" engines. This convention uses the longest horizontal dimension (length or width) of the engine as its axis instead of the line of the crankshaft.

There are many different models of motorcycles that have been produced, and as such, this list is not exhaustive and contains only more notable examples.

Single cylinder

 Armstrong MT500
 BMW R2
 BMW R25 
 BMW R26 
 BMW R27
 BMW F650CS
 BSA Blue Star
 BSA C15
 BSA B44 Shooting Star
 Cagiva 350 SST 
 DKW RT 125
 Ducati Mach 1
 Ducati Supermono
 Harley-Davidson Topper
 Harley-Davidson Baja 100
 Harley-Davidson MT350E
 Honda CB125
 Honda CBR250R/CBR300R
 Honda CRF series
 Honda Dream Yuga
 Honda Grom
 Honda NF110i/125i
 Honda Rebel 300 (Single cylinder, after model change in 2020) 
 Honda Super Cub
 Honda Winner
 Honda XBR500
 Honda XL250
 Honda XL350R
 Husqvarna Vitpilen/Svartpilen 401
 Husqvarna Vitpilen/Svartpilen 701
 Honda XR250
 Kawasaki Z125 Pro
 Kawasaki KLR650
 Kawasaki Ninja 250SL
 KTM 200 Duke
 KTM 390 Duke
 KTM 690 Duke
 Langer's "NSU Bison 2000" 2 liter single
 Moto Guzzi Cardellino
 MV Agusta 125 SOHC
 MZ SM 125
 New Werner
 Norton CS1
 Peugeot JetForce
 Royal Enfield Bullet
 Royal Enfield Himalayan
 Sachs MadAss
 Suzuki Boulevard S40
 Suzuki DR-Z400
 Suzuki DR650
 Suzuki Gixxer 150, 250, SF250
 Suzuki LS650 Savage
 Suzuki TU250
 Triumph Ricardo
 Triumph Tiger Cub
 Yamaha MT-03
 Yamaha SR400, SR500 
 Yamaha T-150
 Yamaha XT225, XT250 (Serow)
 Yamaha XT 500, XT 600 (Ténéré)
 Hyosung GD250N
 Werner Dienstkrad 1440cc single cylinder steampunk motorcycle
 Wilkinson TMC

The vast majority of motor scooters are single cylinder (see List of motor scooter manufacturers and brands).

Split-single

The split-single (Doppelkolbenmotor to its German and Austrian manufacturers), is a variant on the two-stroke engine with two cylinders sharing a single combustion chamber. It is also known as a twingle, U-cylinder, or doppelkolben

 DKW SS 250
 EMC 350CC
 Garelli 350CC Turismo
 Puch 250 SGS
 TWN BD250 (Triumph (TWN))
 TWN Cornet

Two cylinder

V-twin

Transverse

 AJS S3 V-twin
 Honda CX series
 Indian 841
 Marusho Lilac V-twin
 Moto Guzzi Le Mans
 Moto Guzzi V7 Sport
 Moto Guzzi Griso
 Moto Guzzi Stelvio
 Moto Guzzi California
 Victoria V35 Bergmeister

Longitudinal

 Aprilia Dorsoduro
 Aprilia Falco
 Aprilia Mana 850
 Aprilia RSV Mille
 Aprilia RSV 1000 R
 Aprilia Shiver
 Aprilia sxv 450 (550)
 Aprilia Tuono
 Britten V1000
 BSA Model E and other models
 Cagiva Raptor 650
 Cagiva Raptor 1000
 Ducati Monster 696
 Ducati 748
 Ducati 749
 Ducati Monster 821
 Ducati 848
 Ducati 851
 Ducati 888
 Ducati 899
 Ducati 916
 Ducati 959
 Ducati 996
 Ducati 998
 Ducati 999
 Ducati 1098
 Ducati 1198
 Ducati 1199
 Ducati 1299
 Ducati Diavel
 Gunbus 410 (Leonhardt Gunbus 410 with 6.7 L/410 ci V-twin)
 Harley-Davidson FL (multiple bikes)
 Harley-Davidson VRSC (the V-rod)
 Harley-Davidson Model 7D
 Hesketh V1000
 Honda NT650
 Honda NT400 (BROS)
 Honda NTV650 Deuville/Revere
 Honda RC51
 Honda VTR1000
 Honda VTR250
 Honda VT1100
 Honda VT750
 KTM 990 Adventure
 KTM 990 Super Duke
 KTM 1190 RC8
 KTM 1290 Super Adventure
 KTM 1290 Super Duke R
 Hyosung GT250
 Hyosung GT650R
 Indian Scout
 Indian Chief
 Pope Model L
 Princeps AutoCar Co V-twin motorcycle
 XL-ALL V-twin
 Suzuki Boulevard M50
 Suzuki SFV650 Gladius
 Suzuki SV650
 Suzuki SV1000
 Suzuki VX 800
 Suzuki V-Strom 650
 Suzuki V-Strom 1000
 Suzuki V-Strom 1050
 Suzuki TL1000R
 Suzuki TL1000S
 Vincent Rapide
 Yamaha Virago
 Yamaha XVS / Dragstar / VStar

Flat-twin

Longitudinal

 BMW R1150GS
 BMW R1150R
 BMW R1200C
 BMW R1200GS
 BMW R1200R
 BMW R1200RT
 BMW R32
 BMW R90S
 BMW Type 255
 Indian Model O
 Harley-Davidson XA
 Ural
 Velocette LE
 Velocette Valiant

Transverse

Williamson Flat Twin
Douglas Dragonfly
Harley-Davidson Model W

Straight twin

a.k.a. parallel-twin, inline-twin, vertical-twin, straight-two, or inline-two

Transverse

 Benelli BN302 / TNT 300
 Benelli 302s
 BMW F800GT
 BMW F800S
 BMW F800ST
 Honda CB200 and CL200
 Honda CB350
 Honda CB360
 Honda CB400T
 Honda CB400 series (2013)
 Honda CB450
 Honda CB500T
 Honda CBR250RR (2017)
 Honda CMX500 (2017)
 Honda NC700 series
 Honda Nighthawk 250
 Husqvarna Nuda 900R
 Husqvarna Nuda 900
 Kawasaki Ninja 250R
 Kawasaki Ninja 300
 Kawasaki Ninja 400
 Kawasaki EN 450ltd
 Kawasaki Ninja EX500R
 Kawasaki Ninja 650R
 Kawasaki Z250
 Kawasaki Z300
 Kawasaki KZ400
 Kawasaki Z750 twin
 Kawasaki KLE500
 Kawasaki W650
 Kawasaki W800
 KTM 790 Duke
 KTM 890 Duke
 MV Agusta 350B Sport
 Norton Commando
 Royal Enfield 700 Meteor
 Royal Enfield 500 Meteor Minor
 Royal Enfield 700 Super Meteor
 Royal Enfield Constellation
 Royal Enfield 750 Interceptor
 Suzuki V-Strom 250
 Suzuki GS500F
 Triumph Bandit
 Triumph Tiger T110
 Triumph Tiger Trail
 Triumph TR6 Trophy
 Yamaha MT-07
 Yamaha XTZ 750 Super Tenere
 Yamaha XT1200Z Super Ténéré
 Yamaha TRX850
 Yamaha TDM900
 Yamaha XS650
 Yamaha YZF-R3

Longitudinal

 Sunbeam S7 and S8

Tandem twin

The Tandem Twin is where the cylinders are longitudinal, and have two cranks geared together. A tandem twin is effectively a pair of geared singles, and is to be distinguished from an inline twin. Tandem twins are suitable primarily for two-stroke racers.

Longitudinal

Kawasaki KR250 and KR350

Three cylinder

Straight three

Transverse

 Benelli Tornado Tre 900
 Benelli TNT 899
 Benelli TNT 1130
 Benelli Tre 1130 K
 BSA Rocket III
 Kawasaki triples
 S1 Mach I
 S2 Mach II
 H1 Mach III
 H2 Mach IV
 Laverda 1000 3C
 Laverda Jota
 Laverda 1200 TS Mirage
 MV Agusta 500 Three
 MV Agusta F3 (675/800)
 MV Augusta Brutale 800
 Suzuki GT380
 Suzuki GT550
 Suzuki GT750
 Triumph Daytona 675
 Triumph Daytona 955i
 Triumph Legend TT
 Triumph Street Triple
 Triumph Speed Triple
 Triumph Sprint
 Triumph Tiger 800
 Triumph Tiger 1050
 Triumph Tiger Explorer
 Triumph Trident 750
 Yamaha MT-09 (a.k.a. Yamaha FZ-09)
 Yamaha MT-09 Tracer (FJ-09)
Yamaha XSR900
 Yamaha XS 750
 Yamaha XS 850

Longitudinal

 BMW K75 
 Triumph Rocket III
 Triumph Rocket 3

V-three

Transverse

 BSL 500 V3
 Honda MVX250F
 Honda NS400R
 Honda NS500

Four cylinder
This is a partial list of some of the many four-cylinder motorcycle designs.

Straight four

Transverse

 Benelli BN600/ TNT600i
BMW S1000RR
Honda RC181
 Honda CB400SF
 Honda CBR600RR
 Honda CBR650R
 Honda CB750
 Honda CB900c
 Honda CB1000c
 Honda CB1100
 Honda CBR1100XX
 Kawasaki Concours
 Kawasaki 1400GTR
 Kawasaki Eliminator (some models only)
 Kawasaki GPZ900R (a.k.a.  Ninja 900)
 Kawasaki Z1
 Kawasaki Z1000
 Kawasaki Z900
 Kawasaki ZRX1100
 Kawasaki Ninja ZX-10R
 kawasaki Ninja ZX-25R
 Kawasaki Ninja ZX-12R
 MV Agusta F4 series
 Muench Mammut (Münch)
 Suzuki GSX-R600
 Suzuki GSX-RR
 Suzuki GSX-650F
 Suzuki Hayabusa
 Suzuki 1200 Bandit
 Triumph Speed Four
 Triumph TT600
 Yamaha FZ6 and FZ6R
 Yamaha FZ8 and FAZER8
 Yamaha Zeal FZX250
 Yamaha XJ6
 Yamaha XJ750 Maxim

Longitudinal

 Ace Motor Corporation fours
 Auto Four
 BMW K1
 BMW K100
 Brough Superior Austin Four
 FN Four
 Indian Four
 Nimbus
 Pierce Four
 Roadog
 Various Henderson Motorcycle fours

V-four

Transverse

 Ariel Ace
 Aprilia RSV4
 BUB Seven Streamliner
 Ducati Apollo
 Ducati Desmosedici RR
 Ducati Panigale V4
 Honda Magna
 Honda RC30
 Honda RC45
 Honda RVF400
 Honda RVF750
 Honda VFR750F
 Honda VF400F
 Honda VF500F
 Honda Sabre V4
 Honda VF1000
 Honda VFR400
 Honda VFR800
 Honda VFR1200F
 Honda VFR1200X
 Matchless Silver Hawk
 Norton V4 RR
 Suzuki Madura
 Suzuki GV1400 Cavalcade
 Yamaha Venture
 Yamaha VMax
 Yamaha Rz-500

Longitudinal

 Honda ST1100
 Honda ST1300
 Honda CTX1300

Flat four

Longitudinal

Honda Gold Wing
Suprine Exodus (uses BMW flat four)
Zündapp K800/KS800
Wooler 500cc (1948)

Square four

 Ariel Square Four
 Suzuki RG500
 Suzuki RS67

H four

Transverse

Brough Superior Golden Dream

Five cylinder

Straight five

Transverse

 Honda RC148

V-five

Transverse

Honda RC211V

Six cylinder

Straight six

Transverse

 Benelli Sei
 BMW K1600
 Honda RC166
 Honda CBX
 Honda RC series
 Honda RC174
 Horex VR6
 Kawasaki Z1300
 Suzuki Stratosphere

Flat six

Longitudinal

 Honda GoldWing
 Honda Rune 2004-2005
 Honda Valkyrie

V-six

8 cylinder

V-8

Longitudinal

 Aurora V-8 motorcycle
 Bi-Autogo
 Boss Hoss Cycles V8 models
 Curtiss V-8 motorcycle
 Morbidelli V8
 Sabertooth Turbocat
 Olson's Flathead V-8
 Rapom V-8

Transverse

 Moto Guzzi V8
 PGM V-8

Straight-8

10 cylinder

V-10

Longitudinal

 Millyard Viper V10
 Dodge Tomahawk
 Boss Hoss with V-10

12 cylinder

V-12

Transverse

 Bigtoe
 Olson Zephyr V-12
 Andreas Georgeades' Honda CBX V12

48 cylinder

Transverse

 Simon Whitlock's 48-cylinder motorcycle

Turbocharged and supercharged

 Honda CX 500 Turbo / 650 Turbo
 Yamaha XJ 650 Turbo
 Suzuki XN 85 Turbo
 Kawasaki Z 750 Turbo
 Kawasaki Ninja H2
 Kawasaki Ninja H2R

Wankel

The Wankel engine is a type of internal combustion engine using an eccentric rotary design to convert pressure into rotating motion. All parts rotate consistently in one direction, as opposed to the common reciprocating piston engine, which has pistons violently changing direction. It is also known as a rotary engine.

 Hercules (motorcycle)
 Hercules W-2000
 Norton Classic
 Norton Commander (motorcycle)
 Norton F1
 Norton Interpol 2
 Norton RCW588
 Suzuki RE5
 Van Veen (motorcycle)
 Hercules W-2000 (a.k.a. DKW)
 Yamaha RZ201
 Kawasaki X99

Radial

The radial engine is a reciprocating type internal combustion engine configuration in which the cylinders "radiate" outward from a central crankcase like the spokes of a wheel.

 JRL Cycles Radial Chopper
 Radial Hell

Rotary radial

The rotary engine was an early type of internal combustion engine, usually designed with an odd number of cylinders per row in a radial configuration, in which the crankshaft remained stationary in operation, with the entire crankcase and its attached cylinders rotating around it as a unit.

 Barry Engine
 Millet motorcycle (5 cylinders)
 Megola

Turbine

 Madmax Streetfighter
 MTT Turbine Superbike (a.k.a. Y2K)

Steam

 Bill Barnes's Custom steamer
 Copeland steam bicycle
 De Dion-Bouton steam tricycle
 Geneva steam bicycle
 Hubbard Steamcycle
 Michaux-Perreaux steam velocipede
 Roper steam velocipede
 Stanley Lococycle Model 6 tandem pacer

Electric

Electric motorcycles and scooters are plug-in electric vehicles with two or three wheels powered by electricity.  The electricity is stored on board in a rechargeable battery, which drives one or more electric motors. 

 Agni Motors
 Aptera 2 Series
 Brammo Empulse
 Victory Empulse (after 2015)
 Brammo Enertia
 Čezeta
 Electric dragbike
 Energica Motor Company
 Epeds
 FIM eRoad Racing World Cup
 Harley-Davidson LiveWire
 Johammer J1
 KillaCycle
 Lightning LS-218
 Lit Motors C-1
 Modenas CT series
 MotoCzysz E1pc
 MotoE World Cup
 Peugeot Scoot'Elec
 Piaggio MP3
 Tricyclopod
 TT Zero
 TTXGP
 Uno (dicycle)
 Vectrix
 VinFast Klara
 Yamaha Passol
 Yamaha Tesseract
 Zero Motorcycles
 Zero S
 Zero X
 Zero XU

Diesel

Only very small numbers of diesel engined motorcycles have ever been built. The improved fuel efficiency is offset by the increased weight, reduced acceleration and potential difficulty of starting, at least in colder climates.

 Sommer Diesel 462
 Track T-800CDI
 Neander Turbo Diesel
 Star Twin Thunder Star 1200 TDI
 Hero MotoCorp RNT
Royal Enfield Taurus

Multi-engine

 Gyronaut X-1 two straight two engines
 Triumph Rocket

See also
 Motorcycle motor powered car
 List of motorized trikes
 List of motorcycles of the 1910s
 List of motorcycles of the 1920s
 List of motorcycles of the 1930s
 List of motorcycles of the 1940s
 List of motorcycles of the 1950s
 List of land vehicles types by number of wheels

References

External links
 OB - DKW Supercharged Two-Strokes - Force-Fed Deeks (2013)
 Dark Roast Blend - Unusual Bikes (2013)
 Guide to Types of Motorcycle Engines (2015)

Engine